The 24th District of the Iowa Senate is located in central Iowa, and is currently composed of Boone, Greene, Hamilton, Story, and Webster Counties.

Current elected officials
Jesse Green is the senator currently representing the 24th District.

The area of the 24th District contains two Iowa House of Representatives districts:
The 47th District (represented by Phil Thompson)
The 48th District (represented by Robert Bacon)

The district is also located in Iowa's 4th congressional district, which is represented by Randy Feenstra.

Past senators
The district has previously been represented by:

Hurley Hall, 1983–1988
Paul Pate, 1989–1992
Richard F. Drake, 1993–2002
Jerry Behn, 2003–2021
Jesse Green, 2021–present

See also
Iowa General Assembly
Iowa Senate

References

24